Micrite is a limestone constituent formed of calcareous particles ranging in diameter up to four μm formed by the recrystallization of lime mud.

The term was coined in 1959 by Robert Folk for his carbonate rock classification system. Micrite is derived from MICRocrystalline calcITE. In the Folk classification micrite is a carbonate rock dominated by fine-grained calcite. Carbonate rocks that contain fine-grained calcite in addition to allochems are named intramicrite, oomicrite, biomicrite or pelmicrite under the Folk classification depending on the dominant allochem.  

Micrite is lime mud, carbonate of mud grade. Micrite as a component of carbonate rocks can occur as a matrix, as micrite envelopes around allochems or as peloids. The origin of micrites is still a problem in carbonate sedimentology due to the non-uniqueness of the processes generating it. Micrite can be generated through multiple processes. In lakes and some marine environments, lime mud that could become micrite can form chemically or biochemically through whiting events, whereas in warm stratified marine waters it might be forming chemically. Alternatively, microbial process known as micritization may lead to micrite formation. Other processes which might produce micrite include the disaggregation of peloids, bioerosion, the mechanical degradation of larger carbonate grains and dissolution-reprecipitation processes.

References
Folk, R.L., 1959, Practical petrographic classification of limestones: American Association of Petroleum Geologists Bulletin, v. 43, p. 1-38.
https://www2.imperial.ac.uk/earthscienceandengineering/rocklibrary/viewglossrecord.php?Term=micrite

Limestone